Antti Alexander Kasvio (born 20 December 1973 in Espoo) is a former freestyle swimmer from Finland who won the bronze medal in the 200 m freestyle at the 1992 Summer Olympics in Barcelona, Spain. Together with Jani Sievinen he was Finland's leading swimmer in the 1990s.

At the 1993 European Swimming Championships (long course) in Sheffield, Kasvio won the 200 and the 400 m freestyle. A year later, at the 1994 World Aquatics Championships in Rome, Italy, he won the world title in the 200 m freestyle and captured the silver medal in the 400 m freestyle.

References

1973 births
Living people
Sportspeople from Espoo
Olympic swimmers of Finland
Finnish male freestyle swimmers
Swimmers at the 1992 Summer Olympics
Swimmers at the 1996 Summer Olympics
Olympic bronze medalists for Finland
Olympic bronze medalists in swimming
Finnish male water polo players
World Aquatics Championships medalists in swimming
Medalists at the FINA World Swimming Championships (25 m)
European Aquatics Championships medalists in swimming
Medalists at the 1992 Summer Olympics